Distigmoptera is a genus of flea beetles in the family Chrysomelidae. There are 16 described species in Distigmoptera. They are found in North America and the Neotropics.

Selected species

 Distigmoptera apicalis Blake, 1943
 Distigmoptera borealis Blake, 1943
 Distigmoptera brevihirta Blake
 Distigmoptera capillosa Blake
 Distigmoptera chamorrae Konstantinov & Konstantinova, 2011
 Distigmoptera chrysodaedala Blake, 1951
 Distigmoptera falli Blake, 1943
 Distigmoptera foveolata Balsbaugh, 1968
 Distigmoptera impennata Blake, 1943
 Distigmoptera mesochorea Blake, 1943
 Distigmoptera orchidophila Blake, 1951
 Distigmoptera pilosa (Illiger, 1807)
 Distigmoptera schwarzi Blake, 1943
 Distigmoptera texana Blake, 1943

References

Alticini
Chrysomelidae genera
Articles created by Qbugbot
Taxa named by Doris Holmes Blake